During the Parade of Nations portion of the 2002 Winter Olympics opening ceremony, athletes from each country participating in the Olympics paraded in the arena, preceded by their flag. The flag was borne by a sportsperson from that country chosen either by the National Olympic Committee or by the athletes themselves to represent their country. Costa Rica did not march in the parade, but still competed in the Games.

List

References

National Flag Bearers, 2002 Winter Olympics
Lists of Olympic flag bearers